Jack Champion (born November 2004) is an American actor known for his role as Spider, a human teenager living on Pandora, who first appeared in Avatar: The Way of Water (2022).

Life and career
Champion was born in November 2004, and is based out of Blacksburg, Virginia, United States. He was raised there by his mother, a microbiologist. He began acting at age eight, starting in school theatre. In 2015, he had a small role in the documentary series American Genius.

In 2017, Champion booked a screen test to join the cast of James Cameron's science fiction film Avatar: The Way of Water. Before he was cast in the role, he filmed a small part in the superhero film Avengers: Endgame (2019). He also had a leading role in the horror film The Night Sitter (2018). Champion booked his part in Avatar at age 12, after four months of extensive auditions. He was cast as Spider, a human teenager living amongst Na'vis on Pandora. The nature of Champion's role meant that he had to film all his scenes twice; his work involved two years of performance capture on a soundstage, followed by two and a half years of filming the same scenes in live-action in New Zealand. To maintain a muscular physique over the duration of filming, as his character appears shirtless throughout the film, he exercised extensively with a personal trainer and consumed a high-protein diet. He also learnt freediving and scuba diving for scenes that were filmed underwater. After five years of production, the film was released in 2022, after Champion turned 18. It earned over $2 billion worldwide, becoming the third highest-grossing film of all time. Champion concurrently shot for the sequel, Avatar 3, which will release in 2024, and portions of Avatar 4, which will release in 2026. This was primarily done so that Champion would not age out of his role. 

In 2023, Champion appeared alongside an ensemble cast in the slasher film Scream VI. He will next play the son of star Liam Neeson's character in the thriller Retribution, a remake of the 2015 Spanish film of the same name, and will appear alongside an ensemble cast in Anna Boden and Ryan Fleck's film Freaky Tales.

Filmography

References

External links
 

American male child actors
American male film actors
American male television actors
Male actors from Virginia
2004 births
Living people
21st-century American male actors